This is a list of Members of Parliament (MPs) elected to the House of Representatives at the 1991 Nepalese legislative election and subsequent by-elections.

The list is arranged by constituency. Daman Nath Dhungana served as the Speaker, Girija Prasad Koirala served as Prime Minister and Man Mohan Adhikari served as Leader of Opposition.

House of Representatives composition

Leaders

Presiding officers 
 Speaker of the House of Representatives: Daman Nath Dhungana (Nepali Congress)
 Deputy Speaker of the House of Representatives: Mahantha Thakur (Nepali Congress)

Parliamentary party 

 Prime Minister of Nepal: Hon. Girija Prasad Koirala (Nepali Congress)
 Leader of the Opposition: Hon. Man Mohan Adhikari (CPN (UML))
 Parliamentary party leader of Samyukta Janamorcha Nepal:
 Hon. Lila Mani Pokharel (until 30 June 1993)
 Hon. Amik Sherchan (from 30 June 1993)
 Parliamentary party leader of Nepal Sadbhawana Party: Hon. Gajendra Narayan Singh

Whips 

 Chief Whip of Nepali Congress:
 Hon. Govinda Raj Joshi (until 29 December 1991)
 Hon. Tarini Dutt Chataut (from 14 February 1992)
 Whip of Nepali Congress:
 Hon. Surendra Prasad Chaudhary (until 29 December 1991)
 Hon. Chinkaji Shrestha (from 14 February 1992)

List of MPs elected in the election

By-elections

Changes and defections

References

External links 
संसदीय विवरण पुस्तिका, प्रतिनिधि सभा (२०४८ - २०५१) (Parliament Report Booklet, House of Representatives (1991 - 1994)) (in Nepali)
Election Commission of Nepal

General election 1991
1991-related lists
General election 1991
General election 1991